The 2010–11 EHF Cup Winners' Cup season, VfL Gummersbach won the Europe's club handball tournament.

Knockout stage

Round 1

Round 2

Round 3

Round of 16

|}

Quarterfinals

|}

Semifinals

|}

Finals

|}

References 
 Scoresway.com

External links 
 EHF Cup Winners' Cup website

EHF Cup Winners' Cup seasons
2010 in handball
2011 in handball
2010 in European sport
2011 in European sport